The 1995 Cork Intermediate Football Championship was the 60th staging of the Cork Intermediate Football Championship since its establishment by the Cork County Board in 1909. The draw for the opening round fixtures took place on 11 December 1994. The championship ran from 14 May to 10 September 1995.

The final was played on 10 September 1995 at Charlie Hurley Park in Bandon, between Dohenys and Kilmurry, in what was their first ever meeting in a final. Dohenys won the match by 0-11 to 0-07 to claim their second championship title overall and a first title in 23 years.

Kilmurry's Denis Moss was the championship's Ztop scorer with 1-22.

Results

First round

Second round

Quarter-finals

Semi-finals

Final

Championship statistics

Top scorers

Overall

In a single game

References

Cork Intermediate Football Championship